Michael Richard Schutte (9 December 1950 – 14 July 2008) was a South African professional boxer, actor, comedian and singer.

Professional career

In May 1973 he contested the vacant Transvaal heavyweight title against Johnny Britz but was disqualified in the second round. Two months later he fought a rematch against Johnny Britz winning the Transvaal heavyweight title on points. During April 1974, he fought Jimmy Richards for the South African heavyweight title losing in a technical knockout. He would fight Jimmy Richards for the title two more times obtaining the South African heavyweight title in September 1975 on points. He would retain the title for less than a year when Gerrie Coetzee fought him in August 1976 and lost when he was disqualified in the sixth round. Shutte attempted to regain the title from Gerrie Coetzee in April 1977 but lost on points. He fought his last fight against Neil Malpass in June 1979 and announced his retirement. He was trained by Alan Toweel.

Filmography

Schutte starred in a number of South African films, playing himself in some of them:
 Io sto con gli ippopotami (1979)
 Funny People II (1983)
 Target Scorpion (1983)
 Wolhaarstories (1983)
 You Must Be Joking! (1986)
 Hiding Out (1987)
 You Must Be Joking Too! (1987)
 Oh Schuks ... I'm Gatvol! (2004)

Death

Mike Schutte died on 14 July 2008 at the Emfuleni Medi-Clinic in Vanderbijlpark of liver failure, thrombosis and an enlarged heart after being admitted two days earlier.

Professional boxing record

|-
| style="text-align:center;" colspan="8"|38 Wins (28 knockouts, 10 decisions), 9 Losses (4 knockouts, 5 decision), 2 Draws
|-  style="text-align:center; background:#e3e3e3;"
|  style="border-style:none none solid solid; "|Result
|  style="border-style:none none solid solid; "|Record
|  style="border-style:none none solid solid; "|Opponent
|  style="border-style:none none solid solid; "|Type
|  style="border-style:none none solid solid; "|Rounds
|  style="border-style:none none solid solid; "|Date
|  style="border-style:none none solid solid; "|Location
|  style="border-style:none none solid solid; "|Notes
|- align=center
|Win
|38–9
|align=left| Neil Malpass
|PTS
|8
|18 June 1979
|align=left| 
|align=left|
|- align=center
|style="background:#abcdef;"|Draw
|38–9
|align=left| Dwane Bonds
|PTS
|8
|2 June 1979
|align=left| 
|align=left|
|- align=center
|Win
|37–9
|align=left| Walter Ringo Starr
|KO
|2 (10)
|30 April 1979
|align=left| 
|align=left|
|- align=center
|Loss
|36–9
|align=left| Duane Bobick
|RTD
|8 (10)
|20 March 1978
|align=left| 
|align=left|
|- align=center
|Win
|36–8
|align=left| John Nyalunga
|KO
|1 (6)
|4 February 1978
|align=left| 
|align=left|
|- align=center
|Loss
|35–8
|align=left| Kallie Knoetze
|KO
|2 (10)
|13 August 1977
|align=left| 
|align=left|
|- align=center
|Win
|35–7
|align=left| Fraser Memela
|RTD
|4 (10)
|9 May 1977
|align=left| 
|align=left|
|- align=center
|Loss
|34–7
|align=left| Gerrie Coetzee
|PTS
|12
|16 April 1977
|align=left| 
|align=left|
|- align=center
|Win
|34–6
|align=left| Chuck Wepner
|PTS
|10
|19 February 1977
|align=left| 
|align=left|
|- align=center
|Win
|33–6
|align=left| Rodney Bobick
|UD
|10
|5 October 1976
|align=left| 
|align=left|
|- align=center
|Loss
|32-6
|align=left| Gerrie Coetzee
|DQ
|6 (12)
|16 August 1976
|align=left| 
|align=left|
|- align=center
|Win
|32-5
|align=left| Giuseppe Ros
|PTS
|10
|9 July 1976
|align=left| 
|align=left|
|- align=center
|Win
|31-5
|align=left| Rudie Lubbers
|KO
|3 (10)
|22 May 1976
|align=left| 
|align=left|
|- align=center
|Win
|30-5
|align=left| Terry Hinke
|KO
|3 (10)
|4 May 1976
|align=left| 
|align=left|
|- align=center
|Win
|29-5
|align=left| Tommy Kost
|KO
|2 (10)
|13 April 1976
|align=left| 
|align=left|
|- align=center
|Win
|28-5
|align=left| Pat Duncan
|KO
|4 (10)
|15 March 1976
|align=left| 
|align=left|
|- align=center
|Win
|27-5
|align=left| Obie English
|RTD
|6 (10)
|14 February 1976
|align=left| 
|align=left|
|- align=center
|Win
|26–5
|align=left| Jose Roman
|TKO
|7 (10)
|1 January 1976
|align=left| 
|align=left|
|- align=center
|Win
|25-5
|align=left| Bill Carson
|RTD
|3 (10)
|12 December 1975
|align=left| 
|align=left|
|- align=center
|Win
|24–5
|align=left| Jose Roman
|PTS
|10
|29 November 1975
|align=left| 
|align=left|
|- align=center
|Win
|23–5
|align=left| Roy Wallace
|RTD
|3 (10)
|27 October 1975
|align=left| 
|align=left|
|- align=center
|Win
|22–5
|align=left| Jimmy Richards
|PTS
|12
|13 September 1975
|align=left| 
|align=left|
|- align=center
|Win
|21–5
|align=left| Alfredo Mongol Ortiz
|RTD
|7 (8)
|30 June 1975
|align=left| 
|align=left|
|- align=center
|Win
|20–5
|align=left| Johnny Britz
|TKO
|1 (10)
|17 May 1975
|align=left| 
|align=left|
|- align=center
|Win
|19-5
|align=left| Larry Beilfuss
|RTD
|4 (10)
|7 April 1975
|align=left| 
|align=left|
|- align=center
|Loss
|18–5
|align=left| Jimmy Richards
|PTS
|12
|8 February 1975
|align=left| 
|align=left|
|- align=center
|Loss
|18–4
|align=left| Conny Velensek
|PTS
|10
|30 November 1974
|align=left| 
|align=left|
|- align=center
|Win
|18–3
|align=left| Dawie du Preez
|TKO
|3 (10)
|24 July 1974
|align=left| 
|align=left|
|- align=center
|Loss
|17–3
|align=left| Jimmy Richards
|TKO
|12
|20 April 1974
|align=left| 
|align=left|
|- align=center
|Win
|17–2
|align=left| Paul Simonetti
|RTD
|2 (10)
|2 March 1974
|align=left| 
|align=left|
|- align=center
|Loss
|16–2
|align=left| Dawie du Preez
|KO
|1 (10)
|28 January 1974
|align=left| 
|align=left|
|- align=center
|Win
|16–1
|align=left| Miguel Angel Paez
|RTD
|5 (10)
|20 November 1973
|align=left| 
|align=left|
|- align=center
|Win
|15–1
|align=left| Chris Roos
|TKO
|1 (10)
|13 October 1973
|align=left| 
|align=left|
|- align=center
|Win
|14–1
|align=left| Johnny Britz
|PTS
|10
|14 July 1973
|align=left| 
|align=left|
|- align=center
|Loss
|13–1
|align=left| Johnny Britz
|DQ
|2 (10)
|12 May 1973
|align=left| 
|align=left|
|- align=center
|style="background:#abcdef;"|Draw
|13–0
|align=left| Johnny Britz
|PTS
|8
|7 February 1973
|align=left| 
|align=left|
|- align=center
|Win
|13–0
|align=left| Jimmy Richards
|PTS
|10
|4 November 1972
|align=left| 
|align=left|
|- align=center
|Win
|12–0
|align=left| Japie Pretorius
|TKO
|1 (10)
|27 October 1972
|align=left| 
|align=left|
|- align=center
|Win
|11–0
|align=left| Jimmy Richards
|PTS
|10
|30 September 1972
|align=left| 
|align=left|
|- align=center
|Win
|10–0
|align=left| Peter Boddington
|TKO
|1 (10)
|2 September 1972
|align=left| 
|align=left|
|- align=center
|Win
|9–0
|align=left| Dave Hallinan
|KO
|3 (8)
|15 July 1972
|align=left| 
|align=left|
|- align=center
|Win
|8–0
|align=left| George Labuschagne
|KO
|1 (8)
|26 June 1972
|align=left| 
|align=left|
|- align=center
|Win
|7–0
|align=left| Mariano Echevarria
|PTS
|8
|3 June 1972
|align=left| 
|align=left|
|- align=center
|Win
|6–0
|align=left| Chris Botha
|TKO
|1 (8)
|20 March 1972
|align=left| 
|align=left|
|- align=center
|Win
|5–0
|align=left| Romano Peviani
|KO
|2 (8)
|19 February 1972
|align=left| 
|align=left|
|- align=center
|Win
|4–0
|align=left| Raymond Cross
|TKO
|2 (6)
|17 January 1972
|align=left| 
|align=left|
|- align=center
|Win
|3–0
|align=left| Jan Delport
|TKO
|2 (8)
|7 August 1971
|align=left| 
|align=left|
|- align=center
|Win
|2–0
|align=left| George Labuschagne
|KO
|1 (6)
|15 May 1971
|align=left| 
|align=left|
|- align=center
|Win
|1–0
|align=left| Doug de Wet
|KO
|1 (6)
|8 May 1971
|align=left| 
|align=left|

References

White South African people
1950 births
2008 deaths
Heavyweight boxers
South African male boxers
People from Boksburg
South African male film actors
Sportspeople from Gauteng